The diencephalon (or interbrain) is a division of the forebrain (embryonic prosencephalon). It is situated between the telencephalon and the midbrain (embryonic mesencephalon). The diencephalon has also been known as the 'tweenbrain in older literature. It consists of structures that are on either side of the third ventricle, including the thalamus, the hypothalamus, the epithalamus and the subthalamus.

The diencephalon is one of the main vesicles of the brain formed during embryogenesis. During the third week of development a neural tube is created from the ectoderm, one of the three primary germ layers. The tube forms three main vesicles during the third week of development: the prosencephalon, the mesencephalon and the rhombencephalon. The prosencephalon gradually divides into the telencephalon and the diencephalon.

Structure
The diencephalon consists of the following structures:
Thalamus
Hypothalamus including the posterior pituitary
Epithalamus which consists of:
Anterior and Posterior Paraventricular nuclei
Medial and lateral habenular nuclei
Stria medullaris thalami
Posterior commissure
Pineal body
Subthalamus

Attachments
The optic nerve (CNII) attaches to the diencephalon. The optic nerve is a sensory (afferent) nerve responsible for vision and sight ; it runs from the eye through the optic canal in the skull and attaches to the diencephalon.  The retina itself is derived from the optic cup, a part of the embryonic diencephalon.

Function
The diencephalon is the region of the embryonic vertebrate neural tube that gives rise to anterior forebrain structures including the thalamus, hypothalamus, posterior portion of the pituitary gland, and the pineal gland. The diencephalon encloses a cavity called the third ventricle. The thalamus serves as a relay centre for sensory and motor impulses between the spinal cord and medulla oblongata, and the cerebrum. It recognizes sensory impulses of heat, cold, pain, pressure etc. The floor of the third ventricle is called the hypothalamus. It has control centres for control of eye movement and hearing responses.

Additional images

See also
Diencephalic syndrome
List of regions in the human brain

References

External links
 
 NIF Search – Diencephalon via the Neuroscience Information Framework

 
Animal developmental biology